Bangladesh is a common law country having its legal system developed by the British rulers during their colonial rule over British India. The land now comprises Bangladesh was known as Bengal during the British and Mughal regime while by some other names earlier. Though there were religious and political equipments and institutions from almost prehistoric era, Mughals first tried to recognise and establish them through state mechanisms. The Charter of 1726, granted by King George I, authorised the East India Company to establish Mayor's Courts in Madras, Bombay and Calcutta and is recognised as  the first codified law for the British India. As a part of the then British India, it was the first codified law for the then Bengal too. Since independence in 1971, statutory law enacted by the Parliament of Bangladesh has been the primary form of legislation. Judge-made law continues to be significant in areas such as constitutional law. Unlike in other common law countries, the Supreme Court of Bangladesh has the power to not only interpret laws made by the parliament, but to also declare them null and void and to enforce fundamental rights of the citizens. The Bangladesh Code includes a compilation of all laws since 1836. The vast majority of Bangladeshi laws are in English. But most laws adopted after 1987 are in Bengali. Family law is intertwined with religious law. Bangladesh has significant international law obligations.

During periods of martial law in the 1970s and 1980s, proclamations and ordinances were issued as laws. In 2010, the Supreme Court declared that martial law was illegal, which led to a re-enactment of some laws by parliament. A Right to Information Act has been enacted. Several of Bangladesh's laws are controversial, archaic or in violation of the country's own constitution. They include the country's prostitution law, special powers act, blasphemy law, sedition law, internet regulation law, NGO law, media regulation law, military justice and aspects of its property law. Many colonial laws require modernization.

There are no jury trials in Bangladesh. All criminal and civil cases are decided in bench trials.

According to the World Justice Project, Bangladesh ranked 103rd out of 113 countries in an index of the rule of law in 2016.

Fundamental rights in Bangladesh
Part III of the Constitution of Bangladesh includes the articles of fundamental rights.
 Laws inconsistent with fundamental rights to be void (Article-26)
 Equality before law (Article-27)
 Discrimination on grounds of religion, etc. (Article-28)
 Equality of opportunity in public employment (Article-29)
 Prohibition of foreign titles, etc. (Article-30)
 Right to protection of law (Article-31)
 Protection of right to life and personal liberty (Article-32)
 Safeguards as to arrest and detention (Article-33)
 Prohibition of forced labour (Article-34)
 Protection in respect of trial and punishment (Article-35)
 Freedom of movement (Article-36)
 Freedom of assembly (Article-37)
 Freedom of association (Article-38)
 Freedom of thought and conscience, and of speech (Article-39)
 Freedom of profession or occupation (Article-40)
 Freedom of religion (Article-41)
 Rights of property (Article-42)
 Protection of home and correspondence (Article-43)
 Enforcement of fundamental rights (Article-44)
 Modification of rights in respect of disciplinary law (Article-45)
 Power to provide indemnity (Article-46)
 Saving for certain laws (Article-47)
 Inapplicability of certain articles (Article-47A)

Case law
Judicial precedent is enshrined under Article 111 of the Constitution of Bangladesh.

Bangladeshi courts have provided vital judicial precedent in areas like constitutional law, such as in Bangladesh Italian Marble Works Ltd. v. Government of Bangladesh, which declared martial law illegal. The judgement of Secretary, Ministry of Finance v Masdar Hossain asserted the separation of powers and judicial independence.

In Aruna Sen v. Government of Bangladesh, the Supreme Court set a precedent against unlawful detention and torture. The court affirmed the principle of natural justice in the judgement of Abdul Latif Mirza v. Government of Bangladesh. The two verdicts were precedents for invalidating most detentions under the Special Powers Act, 1974.

The doctrine of legitimate expectation in Bangladeshi law has developed through judicial precedent.

Codification and language
The Bangladesh Code has been published since 1977. Most of its laws, dating between 1836 and 1987, are in English. Following a government circular in 1987, the code has been published primarily in Bengali. The language of the Supreme Court and High Court is English. However, most magistrates courts and district courts use Bengali. The lack of a uniform language has been a cause of concern, with arguments in favor of both English and Bengali. The country's financial sector depends on English, whereas cultural nationalists prefer Bengali.

Freedom of information
The Right to Information Act 2009 passed by the Jatiyo Sangshad was hailed as a major reform. The law allows information requests to most government departments, except the military. Hence, security agreements with foreign countries are not under its purview.

As of 2016, 76,043 requests have been made to the Chief Information Commissioner by citizens and organizations.

Criminal law
The main criminal laws are The Penal Code, 1860, the Code of Criminal Procedure, The Cattle Trespass Act 1871, The Explosive Substances Act 1908, The Prevention of Corruption Act 1947, The Anti-Corruption Act 1957, The Special Powers Act 1974, The Dowry Prohibition Act 1980, The Narcotics (Control) Act 1990, The Women and Children Oppression Act 1995 and The Anti-Terrorism Act 2013.

Company law
Bangladesh's company law has its roots in the Joint Stock Companies Act 1844 enacted by the Parliament of the United Kingdom. It was later influenced by the Companies Act 1857, Companies Act 1913 and Companies Act 1929. The Securities and Exchange Ordinance, 1969 was the most important piece of legislation incorporating corporate activities during the Pakistan period. After the independence of Bangladesh, post partition Indian company law served as a model for reforms. The Company Law Reforms Committee was set up in 1979 with leading civil servants, chartered accountants and lawyers. The committee's recommendations were not implemented until 1994, when the Companies Act (Bangladesh) 1994 was passed by the Jatiyo Sangshad. The Securities and Exchange Commission Act of 1993 created the Bangladesh Securities and Exchange Commission to oversee the country's two stock markets.

Contract law
Bangladeshi contract law is based on the Contract Act 1872 and the Sale of Goods Act 1930.

According to the World Bank's 2016 ease of doing business index, Bangladesh ranks 189th in enforcing contracts.

Religious law
Islamic law applies to Bangladeshi Muslims in family law and inheritance laws. Hindu personal law applies to Bangladeshi Hindus in family law. Bangladeshi Buddhists also follow Hindu personal law. The Christian Marriage Act, 1872 applies to Bangladeshi Christians.

Tax law

The Customs Act 1969 is the basis of customs law. The Income Tax Rules were promulgated by ordinance in 1984. Value Added Tax was revised with the Value Added Tax (VAT) and Supplementary Duty (SD) Act 2012.

The Municipal Taxation Act 1881 governs municipal taxes.

Labour law
The Bangladesh Labour Act 2006 was amended with the Bangladesh Labour (Amendment) Bill, 2013 to improve worker rights, including greater but limited freedom to form trade unions, and improving occupational health and safety condition in factories. In 2017, the government pledged to remove the ban on trade unions in export processing zones.

Property law
The constitution guarantees the right to private property. The Transfer of Property Act, 1882 is the basic property law. However, some government agencies like RAJUK restrict property transfers in urban areas through foreign direct investment. The Vested Property Act allows the government to confiscate property from entities or individuals deemed as enemies of the state.

Intellectual property law
The Patent and Designs Act 1911 is the country's oldest copyright law. The Patent and Design Rules were introduced in 1933. The Copyright Act 2000, Copyright Rules 2006 and Trademarks Act 2009 are the other main laws.

Judiciary

The general hierarchy includes both civil and criminal courts. At the top hierarchy is the Supreme Court of Bangladesh.

Judicial review
Judicial review in Bangladesh is performed by a system of writ petitions to the High Court Division under Article 102 of the constitution.

Alternative dispute resolution
The Bangladesh International Arbitration Center is the sole court of commercial arbitration in the country. It is the country's first center for alternative dispute resolution.

Legal profession
A Bangladeshi lawyer is termed an advocate when he or she enters the Bar. Law students can train abroad, including as barristers in the United Kingdom; as well as in other countries; and return to enroll as advocates in the Bangladeshi bar.

The Bangladesh Bar Council and the Bangladesh Supreme Court Bar Association are the leading lawyers' societies in the country. Many of Asia's leading lawyers. such as former Amnesty International chief Irene Khan, have been Bangladeshi.

See also
 Human rights in Bangladesh
 List of Acts of the Jatiya Sangsad
 List of ordinances issued in Bangladesh
 Executive Magistrate of Bangladesh

References

External links
 http://bdlaws.minlaw.gov.bd/
 http://www.minlaw.gov.bd/
 http://lexintell.com/
 https://legislib.com/
 http://resource.ogrlegal.com
 http://www.sfconsultingbd.com
 https://web.archive.org/web/20151005204131/http://supremecourt.gov.bd/nweb/
 https://web.archive.org/web/20150925020657/http://bdcourts.gov.bd/